The We for the Republic (NplR) is a electoral alliance in San Marino formed by the Socialist Party, Party of Socialists and Democrats, Democratic Movement San Marino Together and We Sammarinese.

The coalition won fourth place in the 2019 elections and entered the government coalition with PDCS, RETE and DML.

Electoral history

References

2019 establishments in San Marino
Left-wing political party alliances
Political parties established in 2019
Political party alliances in San Marino
Social democratic parties in Europe
Social liberal parties
Socialism in San Marino